Euura testaceipes is a species of sawfly belonging to the family Tenthredinidae (common sawflies). The larvae feed within the leaf-stalk (petiole), or midrib of a leaf,
on willows (Salix species) forming a gall. The sawfly was first described by Carl Gustav Alexander Brischke in 1883. E. testaceipes is one of three closely related species known as the Euura amerinae species subgroup. The other members of the group are E. amerinae (Linnaeus, 1758) and E. venusta (Brischke, 1883)

Description of the gall
The spindle-shaped or ovoid gall is formed in the petiole or midrib of a leaf and is 10 mm long and 5 mm wide and contains one larva. It can be found on white willow (S. alba), Babylon willow (S. babylonica), S. blanda, crack willow (S. fragilis) and almond willow (S. triandra). There can be several galls on a leaf.

Distribution
The sawfly has been found in Great Britain, the Netherlands and Poland.

References

External links
 Euura Gallers

Tenthredinidae
Gall-inducing insects
Hymenoptera of Europe
Insects described in 1883
Taxa named by Carl Gustav Alexander Brischke
Willow galls